Sanjay Budhwar (born 8 October 1987) is an Indian first-class cricketer who plays for Haryana.

References

External links
 

1987 births
Living people
Indian cricketers
Haryana cricketers